Scleria triglomerata, also known as the whip nutrush, is a plant in the sedge family Cyperaceae.

Distribution and habitat
Scleria triglomerata grows naturally throughout the United States and also in Canada. Its habitat is varied, including oak and pine woods, thickets, rocky areas and prairies.

References

triglomerata
Flora of Ontario
Flora of the North-Central United States
Flora of the Northeastern United States
Flora of Texas
Flora of the Southeastern United States
Flora of Puerto Rico
Plants described in 1803